The Trinity Church is a religious building in Munich, southern Germany. It is a votive church and was designed in Bavarian Baroque style according to plans from Giovanni Antonio Viscardi from 1711 to 1718. It is a monastery church of the Carmelites and a church of the Metropolitan parish of Our Blessed Lady. During the Second World War this was the only church in the center of Munich, which had been spared from destruction by bombs.

A pledge was kept (due to the prophecy of Anna Maria Lindmayr); people hoped to be spared by the Austrians during the Spanish Succession war.

Architecture 
The church is Munich's first church building in late baroque style. The central building, with its dome and elaborate entrance, was built after Viscardi's death in 1713 by Enrico Zuccalli. The double-faced south façade protrudes the front of the houses of the street. The polygonal main entrance is divided by columns and strong baroque cornices.

Important works by Cosmas Damian Asam (ceiling paintings in the dome), Joseph Ruffini, Andreas Faistenberger, Johann Baptist Straub and Johann Georg Baader can be admired inside. The spire which lost its steepletop in World War II is situated further north next to the former convent.

The patronal feast is All Saints Holy Trinity (the Sunday after Whitsun).

References

External links 
 Photo spread of Dreifaltigkeitskirche / Trinity Church

Baroque architecture in Munich
Roman Catholic churches in Munich
Cultural heritage monuments in Munich